The 1937 Grand National was the 96th running of the Grand National horse race that took place at Aintree Racecourse near Liverpool, England, on 19 March 1937. The estimated crowd of 300,000 is believed by the Aintree executive to be a record for the race, though only those who watched from the racecourse proper were charged admission.

In attendance at Aintree were King George VI and Queen Elizabeth. The steeplechase was won by the aptly-named Royal Mail, at odds of 100/6. The eight-year-old was ridden by jockey Evan Williams and trained by Ivor Anthony, for owner Hugh Lloyd Thomas.

Golden Miller, winner in 1934, went off as 8/1 favourite but refused at the tenth fence, the same obstacle he refused to jump in the 1935 National. Cooleen finished the race in second place, and finished fourth the following year and again in 1939. Pucka Belle was third and Ego fourth. Thirty-three horses ran and all returned safely to the stables.

Media coverage and aftermath
Sixteen-year-old Bruce Hobbs was the youngest rider in the race and later commented that he would have been placed on his mount, Flying Minutes had he not become too excited four fences from home and fallen off in a manner similar to stepping of a bicycle. "Luckily there were no photographers at the fence to record it and I wasn't hurt." Unfortunately for Hobbs he had forgotten that the newsreel cameras had covered the entire race and had indeed captured his fall on film.

Finishing order

Non-finishers

References
https://web.archive.org/web/20131227085539/https://www.sportsbookguardian.com/horse-racing/grand-national/winners

 1937
Grand National
Grand National
20th century in Lancashire
Grand National